The Texas Rangers 1986 season involved the Rangers finishing 2nd in the American League West with a record of 87 wins and 75 losses.

Michael Stone was President of the Rangers and promoted Tom Grieve to General Manager.

Offseason
 November 9, 1985: Chris Welsh was released by the Rangers.
 November 25, 1985: Wayne Tolleson and Dave Schmidt were traded by the Rangers to the Chicago White Sox for Ed Correa, Scott Fletcher and a player to be named later. The White Sox completed the trade by sending José Mota to the Rangers on December 11.
 December 20, 1985: Ellis Valentine was released by the Rangers.
 December 20, 1985: Dickie Noles was released by the Rangers.

Regular season
 September 13, 1986: Rubén Sierra became the youngest player in history to hit home runs from both sides of the plate in one game. This was accomplished against the Minnesota Twins.
 Ed Correa set a club record for most wins by a rookie pitcher.
 In his rookie year, Pete Incaviglia tied the club record for most home runs in a season.

Season standings

Record vs. opponents

Notable transactions
 June 2, 1986: John Barfield was drafted by the Texas Rangers in the 11th round of the 1986 amateur draft. Player signed June 5, 1986.
 June 2, 1986: Wayne Rosenthal was drafted by the Rangers in the 24th round of the 1986 Major League Baseball draft.
 September 30, 1986: Randy Kramer was traded by the Rangers to the Pittsburgh Pirates for Jeff Zaske.

Roster

Player stats

Batting

Starters by position
Note: Pos = Position; G = Games played; AB = At bats; H = Hits; Avg. = Batting average; HR = Home runs; RBI = Runs batted in

Other batters
Note: G = Games played; AB = At bats; H = Hits; Avg. = Batting average; HR = Home runs; RBI = Runs batted in

Pitching

Starting pitchers
Note: G = Games pitched; IP = Innings pitched; W = Wins; L = Losses; ERA = Earned run average; SO = Strikeouts

Other pitchers
Note: G = Games pitched; IP = Innings pitched; W = Wins; L = Losses; ERA = Earned run average; SO = Strikeouts

Relief pitchers
Note: G = Games pitched; IP = Innings pitched; W = Wins; L = Losses; SV = Saves; ERA = Earned run average; SO = Strikeouts

Farm system

References

1986 Texas Rangers at Baseball Reference
1986 Texas Rangers at Baseball Almanac

Texas Rangers seasons
Texas Rangers season
Texas Rang